John Dudley Harwood Gilbert (8 October 1910 – 24 June 1992)  was an English first-class cricketer who played for Derbyshire between 1930 and 1936.

Gilbert was born at Chellaston Manor, Derbyshire and was educated at Repton School. He made his debut for Derbyshire in the 1930 season in June against Somerset but made little impression. He played three more games in the 1930 season, and five in the 1931 season. He then played one game in the 1932 season and one in the 1936 season.

Gilbert was a right-hand batsman and played 11 innings in 11 first-class matches with a top score of 25 and an average of 9.63.

Gilbert died at Wollaton, Nottingham at the age of 81.

References

1910 births
1992 deaths
Derbyshire cricketers
English cricketers
People from Chellaston
People from Wollaton
Cricketers from Nottinghamshire
Cricketers from Derby